F+ may refer to:

F+ (pitch), a musical pitch traditionally used for the Northumbrian smallpipes 
F+ a bacterium having F-plasmid in bacterial conjugation
In Academic grading in the United States, F+ is a rarely used grade above F
 F+, a sister channel of TV+, Bulgaria